Paul Kahaibale Mugamba is a Ugandan lawyer and judge who has served as a member of the Supreme Court of Uganda since September 2017. Immediately prior to his appointment to the Supreme Court, he served as a Justice of the Uganda Court of Appeal.

See also
 Judiciary of Uganda

References

External links
Lawyer accuses Museveni of bribing voters

Living people
Year of birth missing (living people)
21st-century Ugandan judges
Makerere University alumni
Law Development Centre alumni
Justices of the Supreme Court of Uganda